Murder, She Wrote is a 2009 episodic point-and-click adventure video game developed by Legacy Games, based on the 1984–1996 television series of the same name. The game features five murder mysteries that the player tackles through point-and-click puzzle solving methods. Although none of the actors from the original TV show lend their voice in the game, the likenesses of Angela Lansbury as Jessica Fletcher, William Windom as Dr. Seth Hazlitt, and Ron Masak as Sheriff Mort Metzger are used.

A sequel, Murder She Wrote 2, was launched by Legacy Interactive in November 2012.

Stories
A Deadly Catch: A local fisherman is found murdered on his boat, and Jessica's investigation reveals that there are more than lobsters being hauled in.

Murder in the Maples: While giving a guest lecture at a Vermont college, Jessica stops in a small town to visit an old friend, Maria Olsen, who runs a maple syrup business. However, when the dead body of one of Maria's former employees turns up in the syrup vat, Jessica must work her way through the sticky sweet layer of love, rivalry, and sabotage in order to uncover the sour truth.

A Garden to Die For: Cabot Cove's gardening competition is put on hold when one of the contestants ends up dead, and Jessica must weed through every clue to find the killer.

Ashes to Ashes: Just as Cabot Cove's city council prepares to renovate a house that's been abandoned for two years, the home's previous owner is found murdered inside, and a local rumor of a hidden fortune leads Jessica to wonder if a treasure hunter is to blame.

Final Curtain: Jessica visits her identical cousin, Emma MacGill, in London, and ends up in another investigation when a famous actress is found murdered in her dressing room.

Cast
 Phoebe Moyer as Jessica Fletcher (likeness of Angela Lansbury)
 Roger L. Jackson as Sheriff Mort Metzger (likeness of Ron Masak)
 Gavin Hammon as Dr. Seth Hazlitt (likeness of William Windom)
 Andrew Chaiken as Sheriff Ashmont

References

2009 video games
Episodic video games
Legacy Games games
MacOS games
Murder, She Wrote
Point-and-click adventure games
Role-playing video games
Single-player video games
Video games based on television series
Video games developed in the United States
Video games featuring female protagonists
Windows games
Focus Multimedia games